Canada has numerous Indian reserves for First Nations people, which were mostly established by the Indian Act of 1876 and have been variously expanded and reduced by royal commissions since. They are sometimes incorrectly called by the American term "reservations".

Alberta

British Columbia

Manitoba 

 A Kwis Ki Mahka Indian Reserve — Fox Lake Cree Nation
 Amik Wachink Sakahikan — Garden Hill First Nation
 Anderson — Norway House Cree Nation
 Andrew Bay — God's Lake First Nation 
 Bella Lake Exchange Lands — Garden Hill First Nation 
 Berens River 13 — Berens River First Nation
 Birch Landing — Brokenhead Ojibway Nation 
 Birdtail Creek 57 — Birdtail Sioux First Nation 
 Birdtail Hay Lands 57A — Birdtail Sioux First Nation 
 Black River 9 — Black River First Nation 
 Black Sturgeon — Marcel Colomb First Nation 
 Bloodvein 12 — Bloodvein First Nation 
 Bottle Lake 61B — Keeseekoowenin Ojibway First Nation 
 Brochet 197 — Barren Lands First Nation, Brochet, Manitoba (pop. 308)
 Brokenhead 4 — Brokenhead Ojibway Nation
 Buffalo Point 36 — Buffalo Point First Nation, Buffalo Point, Manitoba
 Buffalo Point First Nation 1 — Buffalo Point First Nation 
 Buffalo Point First Nation 2 — Buffalo Point First Nation 
 Buffalo Point First Nation 3 — Buffalo Point First Nation
 Cantin Lake — St. Theresa Point First Nation 
 Canupawakpa Dakota First Nation — Canupawakpa Dakota First Nation 
 Channel Island Sapotaweyak Cree Nation — Sapotaweyak Cree Nation
 Chataway Lake/Knife Lake — God's Lake First Nation 
 Chemawawin 1 — Chemawawin Cree Nation 
 Chemawawin 2 — Chemawawin Cree Nation 
 Chemawawin 3 — Chemawawin Cree Nation 
 Chepi Lake Indian Reserve — Manto Sipi Cree Nation 
 Churchill 1 — Sayisi Dene
 Clear Lake 61A — Keeseekoowenin Ojibway First Nation 
 Crane River 51 — O-Chi-Chak-Ko-Sipi First Nation
 Cross Lake 19 — Cross Lake First Nation 
 Cross Lake 19A — Cross Lake First Nation 
 Cross Lake 19B — Cross Lake First Nation 
 Cross Lake 19C — Cross Lake First Nation 
 Cross Lake 19D — Cross Lake First Nation 
 Cross Lake 19E — Cross Lake First Nation 
 Cross Lake 19X01 — Cross Lake First Nation 
 Cross Lake 19X02 — Cross Lake First Nation
 Cross Lake 19X03 — Cross Lake First Nation 
 Cross Lake 19X05 — Cross Lake First Nation 
 Cross Lake 19X06 — Cross Lake First Nation
 Dakota Plains 6A — Dakota Plains First Nation 
 Dakota Tipi 1  — Dakota Tipi First Nation 
 Dauphin River — Dauphin River First Nation 
 Dog Creek 46 — Lake Manitoba First Nation 
 Ebb And Flow 52 — Ebb and Flow First Nation
 Esker Ridge A Indian Reserve — God's Lake First Nation
 Esker Ridge B — God's Lake First Nation 
 Fairford 50 — Pinaymootang First Nation 
 Feather Rapids — Wasagamack First Nation
 Fisher River 44 — Fisher River Cree Nation 
 Fisher River 44A — Fisher River Cree Nation
 Fishing Station 62A — Birdtail Sioux First Nation, Canupawakpa Dakota First Nation
 Fort Alexander 3  — Sagkeeng First Nation
 Fox Lake 1 — Fox Lake Cree Nation
 Fox Lake 2 — Fox Lake Cree Nation
 Fox Lake West 3 — Fox Lake Cree Nation
 Gambler 63 — Gamblers First Nation
 Garden Hill First Nation — Garden Hill First Nation
 Gillam Indian Settlement — Fox Lake Cree Nation, Gillam, Manitoba
 God's Lake 23 — God's Lake First Nation
 God's Lake Southeast of Community — God's Lake First Nation
 God's River 86A — Manto Sipi Cree Nation
 God's River Indian Settlement — Manto Sipi Cree Nation, Gods River, Manitoba
 Grand Rapids 33 — Misipawistik Cree Nation
 Granville Lake Indian Settlement — Mathias Colomb First Nation, Granville Lake, Manitoba
 Hart — Norway House Cree Nation 
 Hawkins — God's Lake First Nation 
 High Hill Lake — Bunibonibee Cree Nation 
 Highrock 199  — Mathias Colomb First Nation 
 Hole Or Hollow Water 10 — Hollow Water First Nation
 Hurley Island Indian Reserve — Manto Sipi Cree Nation
 Indian Gardens 8 — Swan Lake First Nation
 Jackhead 43 — Kinonjeoshtegon First Nation
 Jackhead 43A — Kinonjeoshtegon First Nation
 Kamihkowapihskak Pawistik — Mathias Colomb First Nation
 Kapawasihk — Nisichawayasihk Cree Nation
 Keeseekoowenin 61 — Keeseekoowenin Ojibway First Nation
 Kenyan Lake — God's Lake First Nation
 Kimosominahk  — Mathias Colomb First Nation 
 Kisipikamak — Bunibonibee Cree Nation 
 Lac Brochet 197A — Northlands First Nation 
 Little Grand Rapids 14 — Little Grand Rapids First Nation 
 Little Saskatchewan 48 — Little Saskatchewan First Nation 
 Little Saskatchewan 48B — Little Saskatchewan First Nation 
 Long Plain 6 — Long Plain First Nation
 Mile 20 Second Revision — Nisichawayasihk Cree Nation 
 Mistiategameek Sipi — Mathias Colomb First Nation 
 Monahawuhkan — Nisichawayasihk Cree Nation 
 Moose Lake 31A — Mosakahiken Cree Nation
 Moose Lake 31C — Mosakahiken Cree Nation 
 Moose Lake 31D — Mosakahiken Cree Nation 
 Moose Lake 31G — Mosakahiken Cree Nation 
 Moose Lake 31J — Mosakahiken Cree Nation 
 Mooseocoot — War Lake First Nation 
 Mooseocoot 2 — War Lake First Nation
 Mooseocoot 3 — War Lake First Nation 
 Moosowhapihsk Sakahegan — Mathias Colomb First Nation 
 Mukwa Narrows — St. Theresa Point First Nation 
 Munro Lake Indian Reserve — Bunibonibee Cree Nation 
 Naawi-Oodena
 Na-Sha-Ke-Penais — Brokenhead Ojibway Nation
 Napahkapihskow Sakhahigan — Mathias Colomb First Nation 
 Naytawunkank — Wasagamack First Nation
 Nelson House 170 — Nisichawayasihk Cree Nation 
 Nelson House 170A — Nisichawayasihk Cree Nation 
 Nelson House 170B — Nisichawayasihk Cree Nation
 Nelson House 170C — Nisichawayasihk Cree Nation
 Nihkik Ohnikapihs — Mathias Colomb First Nation
 North Prominent Ridge — God's Lake First Nation
 Northwest Angle 34C — Animakee Wa Zhing 37 First Nation
 Northwest Angle 37C — Animakee Wa Zhing 37 First Nation
 Norway House 17 — Norway House Cree Nation, Norway House, Manitoba (pop. 4,071)
 Norway House 17A — Norway House Cree Nation 
 Norway House 17B — Norway House Cree Nation 
 Norway House Indian Reserves   — Norway House Cree Nation 
 Norway House Indian Reserve No. 17D-1 — Norway House Cree Nation 
 Norway House No. 17C-1≈46 — Norway House Cree Nation
 Notin Sakahekun — Bunibonibee Cree Nation 
 Numaykoos Sakaheykun — Nisichawayasihk Cree Nation

 O-Pipon-Na-Piwin Cree Nation 1 — O-Pipon-Na-Piwin Cree Nation 
 Oak Lake 59A — Canupawakpa Dakota First Nation
 Odei River — Nisichawayasihk Cree Nation
 Ohpahahpiskow Sakahegan — Mathias Colomb First Nation 
 Opaskwayak Cree Nation 21 — Opaskwayak Cree Nation 
 Opaskwayak Cree Nation 21A — Opaskwayak Cree Nation 
 Opaskwayak Cree Nation 21A South — Opaskwayak Cree Nation
 Opaskwayak Cree Nation 21B~K — Opaskwayak Cree Nation 
 Opaskwayak Cree Nation 21L — Opaskwayak Cree Nation 
 Opaskwayak Cree Nation 21N — Opaskwayak Cree Nation 
 Opaskwayak Cree Nation 21P — Opaskwayak Cree Nation
 Opaskwayak Cree Nation 27A — Opaskwayak Cree Nation 
 Opaskwayak Cree Nation Egg Lake Indian Reserve#1 — Opaskwayak Cree Nation 
 Opaskwayak Cree Nation Rocky Lake — Opaskwayak Cree Nation 
 Opaskwayak Cree Nation Root Lake 231 — Opaskwayak Cree Nation 
 Opaskwayak Cree Nation Salt Channel 21D — Opaskwayak Cree Nation 
 Opekanowi Sakaheykun — Nisichawayasihk Cree Nation
 Opekunosakakanihk — Nisichawayasihk Cree Nation 
 Opischikonayak Nation — Bunibonibee Cree Nation 
 Overflowing River Sapotaweyak Cree Nation — Sapotaweyak Cree Nation 
 Oxford House 24 — Bunibonibee Cree Nation 
 Oxford House 24A~D — Bunibonibee Cree Nation 
 Oxford Lake North Shore — Bunibonibee Cree Nation 
 Pachapesihk Wasahow — Mathias Colomb First Nation 
 Pauingassi First Nation — Pauingassi First Nation 
 Pe-Ta-Waygamak — Garden Hill First Nation 
 Peguis 1B — Peguis First Nation
 Peguis 1C — Peguis First Nation
 Peguis 1D — Peguis First Nation 
 Peguis 1E — Peguis First Nation 
 Peguis 1F — Peguis First Nation 
 Peguis 1G — Peguis First Nation 
 Peguis 1H — Peguis First Nation
 Peguis 1I — Peguis First Nation
 Pelican Rapids Access Road Phase — Sapotaweyak Cree Nation 
 Peter Burton'S/Shorty Rapids — God's Lake First Nation 
 Pigeon River 13A — Berens River First Nation 
 Pine Creek 66A — Pine Creek First Nation
 Ponask Lake — Norway House Cree Nation 
 Poplar River — Poplar River First Nation
 Prominent Ridge Indian Reserve — Manto Sipi Cree Nation 
 Pth 10 Sapotaweyak Cree Nation — Sapotaweyak Cree Nation
 Pukatawagan 198  — Mathias Colomb First Nation 
 Red Cross Lake East — God's Lake First Nation
 Red Cross Lake North — God's Lake First Nation
 Red Sucker Lake 1976 — Red Sucker Lake First Nation
 Red Sucker Lake No. 1976 A — Red Sucker Lake First Nation
 Red Sucker Lake No. 1976 B — Red Sucker Lake First Nation
 Red Sucker Lake No. 1976 C — Red Sucker Lake First Nation
 Red Sucker Lake No. 1976 D — Red Sucker Lake First Nation
 Red Sucker Lake No. 1976 F — Red Sucker Lake First Nation
 Red Sucker Lake No. 1976 H — Red Sucker Lake First Nation
 Reed River 36A — Buffalo Point First Nation
 Rolling River 67 — Rolling River First Nation
 Rolling River 67A — Rolling River First Nation
 Rolling River 67B — Rolling River First Nation
 Root Lake Beach Ridge Site Indian Reserve — Opaskwayak Cree Nation 
 Roseau Rapids 2A — Roseau River Anishinabe First Nation
 Roseau River 2 — Roseau River Anishinabe First Nation 
 Roseau River 2B — Roseau River Anishinabe First Nation 
 Sandy Bay 5 — Sandy Bay First Nation 
 Sapotaweyak Cree Nation — Sapotaweyak Cree Nation 
 Sapotaweyak Cree Nation - Spruce Island — Sapotaweyak Cree Nation
 Seeseep Sakahikan — Garden Hill First Nation
 Shamattawa 1 — Shamattawa First Nation
 Shoal Lake 37A — Animakee Wa Zhing 37 First Nation
 Shoal River 65A — Sapotaweyak Cree Nation
 Shoal River 65B — Sapotaweyak Cree Nation
 Shoal River 65F — Sapotaweyak Cree Nation
 Sioux Valley Dakota Nation — Sioux Valley First Nation
 Sisipuk Sakahegan (A) — Mathias Colomb First Nation
 Sisipuk Sakahegan (B) — Mathias Colomb First Nation
 Sisipuk Sakahegan (C) — Mathias Colomb First Nation
 South Indian Lake Settlement — O-Pipon-Na-Piwin Cree Nation
 Split Lake 171 — Tataskweyak Cree Nation
 Split Lake 171A — Tataskweyak Cree Nation
 Split Lake 171B — Tataskweyak Cree Nation
 St Theresa Point — St. Theresa Point First Nation
 St. Peters Fishing Station 1A — Peguis First Nation
 Suwanne Lake — Nisichawayasihk Cree Nation
 Swan Lake 7 — Swan Lake First Nation, Swan Lake, Manitoba
 Swan Lake 7A — Swan Lake First Nation
 Swan Lake First Nation 8A — Swan Lake First Nation 
 Wuskwi Sipihk First Nation Swan Lake 65C — Wuskwi Sipihk First Nation (pop. 197)
 Sheth Chok— Northlands First Nation 
 Suwannee Lake — Nisichawayasihk Cree Nation
 Tadoule Lake — Sayisi Dene
 The Narrows 49 — Lake St. Martin First Nation
 The Narrows 49A — Lake St. Martin First Nation 
 Thuycholeeni — Northlands First Nation 
 Thuycholeeni Azé — Northlands First Nation
 Tthekalé Nu — Northlands First Nation 
 Valley River 63A — Tootinaowaziibeeng Treaty Reserve First Nation
 Vermilyea Lake — God's Lake First Nation 
 Wapaminakoskak Narrows — God's Lake First Nation 
 Wapasihk — Nisichawayasihk Cree Nation
 Wapisew Lake — Bunibonibee First Nation
 Wapisu Lake — Nisichawayasihk Cree Nation 
 Wasagamack — Wasagamack First Nation 
 Waterhen 45 — Skownan First Nation 
 Waywayseecappo First Nation — Waywayseecappo First Nation 
 Wepuskow Ohnikahp — Mathias Colomb First Nation
 Wesha Kijay Wasagamach — Garden Hill First Nation
 Whiskeyjack — Cross Lake First Nation
 Whitemud Lake — Bunibonibee Cree Nation
 Winnipekosihk — Norway House Cree Nation
 Wolf River — Garden Hill First Nation
 Wuskwi Sakaheykun — Nisichawayasihk Cree Nation
 Wuskwi Sipi — Nisichawayasihk Cree Nation
 Wuskwi Sipihk 4 — Wuskwi Sipihk First Nation
 Wuskwi Sipihk 5 — Wuskwi Sipihk First Nation
 Wuskwi Sipihk 6 — Wuskwi Sipihk First Nation
 Wuskwi Sipihk 8 — Wuskwi Sipihk First Nation 
 Wuskwi Sipihk First Nation 2 — Wuskwi Sipihk First Nation
 Wuskwi Sipihk First Nation 3A~F — Wuskwi Sipihk First Nation
 Wuskwi Sipihk First Nation No. 1 — Wuskwi Sipihk First Nation
 Wuskwi Sipihk No. 7 — Wuskwi Sipihk First Nation
 Wapikunoo Bay — Nisichawayasihk Cree Nation 
 York Landing — York Factory First Nation

New Brunswick

Newfoundland and Labrador

Notes 
The Inuit self-governing region of Nunatsiavut, the unrecognized Inuit territory of NunatuKavut and Nitassinan, the ancestral homeland of the Innu, are also located in Labrador. The Qalipu Mi'kmaq, a Miꞌkmaq     people, have passed the final stages of obtaining Status under the Indian Act, and since 2011 has been a recognized band in Newfoundland.

Nova Scotia

Northwest Territories 

There are only three actual Indian reserves in the Northwest Territories, Hay River Dene 1, Salt River 195 and Salt Plains 195. All other places are Indian settlements. The Smith's Landing First Nation is, according to INAC, headquartered in the NWT but are listed as an Alberta First Nations. Not included are Enterprise (predominantly non-Aboriginal (57.1%), 23.8% First Nations, 9.5% Métis, 9.5% Inuit) and Norman Wells (predominantly non-Aboriginal (58.3%), 25.8% First Nations, 11.3% Métis, 2.0% Inuit and 3.9% other Aboriginal). Also not included are the Inuvialuit communities of Paulatuk, Sachs Harbour Tuktoyaktuk and Ulukhaktok. Of these only Tuktoyaktuk reported a First Nations presence (1.7%).

Ontario

Prince Edward Island

Quebec

Notes
Other First Nations lands can be found at list of Cree and Naskapi territories in Quebec and Inuit lands at list of northern villages and Inuit reserved lands in Quebec.

In Quebec, the Indian Act applies only to the First Nations of the southern part of the province, so Indian reserves are only found in the south. The Minister of Crown–Indigenous Relations assigns 34 tracts of land as Indian reserves and settlements under the Indian Act:

Saskatchewan

Yukon

See also 
List of Indian reserves in Canada by population
List of place names in Canada of Aboriginal origin
List of First Nations governments
List of First Nations peoples
Classification of indigenous peoples of the Americas

References

External links 
 Aboriginal Canada Portal's complete list of communities, with links to individual statistics and profile
 Complete List of Manitoba First Nation Communities

Indian reserves
Indian reserves
Indian reserves
Indian reserves